Calling Zero is an album by Go Back Snowball, a side project of Robert Pollard with Mac McCaughan, released in 2002.

Track listing
All songs written by Robert Pollard and Mac McCaughan.

Side A
Radical Girl
Calling Zero
Never Forget Where You Get Them
Red Hot Halos
Again The Waterloo
Climb

Side B
Go Gold
Lifetime For The Mavericks
Throat Of Throats
Ironrose Worm
It Is Divine
Dumbluck Systems Stormfront

Personnel
Robert Pollard – vocals
Mac McCaughan – drums, guitar, keyboards

References

2002 albums